The 2023 Men's Ice Hockey World Championships will be the 86th such event hosted by the International Ice Hockey Federation. Teams will participate in several levels of competition. The competition will also serve as qualifications for division placements in the 2024 competition.

Championship (Top Division)

The tournament will be held in Tampere, Finland and Riga, Latvia from 12 to 28 May 2023.

Teams

 – Host

 – Promoted from Division I A

 – Host

 – Promoted from Division I A

Division I

Group A
The tournament will be held in Nottingham, England from 29 April to 5 May 2023.

Group B
The tournament will be held in Tallinn, Estonia from 23 to 29 April 2023.

Division II

Group A
The tournament will be held in Madrid, Spain from 16 to 22 April 2023.

Group B
The tournament will be held in Istanbul, Turkey from 17 to 23 April 2023.

Division III

Group A
The tournament will be held in Cape Town, South Africa from 17 to 23 April 2023.

Group B
The tournament was held in Sarajevo, Bosnia and Herzegovina from 27 February to 5 March 2023.

Division IV

The tournament will be held in Ulaanbaatar, Mongolia from 23 to 26 March 2023.

References

External links
Official website

 
World Ice Hockey Championships, Men's
IIHF Men's World Ice Hockey Championships
World Championships, Men's